The Australian Cartoonists' Association is the Australian professional cartoonists' organisation and was established on 17 July 1924 as the Society of Australian Black and White Artists.

It soon became The Black and White Artists Society; and, by 1938, its name had been changed to The Black and White Artists Club. By 1939, it had a sketching division and an etching division.

First clubrooms
The Association's first clubrooms were at 250 George Street, Sydney.

Founding members
Founding members were Reg Russom, Unk White, Syd Nicholls, Jack Quayle, John Wiseman, Jack Baird, Joe Jonsson, Cyril Samuels, Frank Jessop, Brodie Mack, Mick Paul, Harry J Weston, Jack Waring, Syd Miller, Arthur Mailey, F H Cumberworth, Fred Knowles and Cecil Hartt, who was elected president.

Other notable members
 Jules Faber (elected president 2009)
 Alex Gurney

Hall of Fame

 Jimmy Bancks (1889–1952) – creator of Ginger Meggs
 Stanley Cross (1888–1977) – creator of The Potts and Wally and the Major
 Will Dyson (1880–1938) – political cartoonist (Bulletin, Melbourne Punch, Daily Herald)
 Ken Emerson (1927-2010) - creator of On The Rocks and The Warrumbunglers
 George Finey (1895–1987) – cartoonist (Smith's Weekly)
 May Gibbs (1877-1969) - author and illustrator
 Alex Gurney (1902–1955) – creator of Bluey and Curley
 Geoff Hook (1928-) - editorial cartoonist for the Hobart Mercury, Herald Sun
 Eric Jolliffe (1907-2001) - creator of Witchetty's Tribe and Saltbush Bill
 Percy Leason (1889–1959) – early political cartoonist (Bulletin, Melbourne Punch)
 Vane Lindesay (1920-) - cartoonist, author and cartoon historian
 Norman Lindsay (1879-1969) - acclaimed artist, sculptor and cartoonist
 David Low (1891-1963) - political cartoonist and caricaturist
 Phil May (1864-1903) - caricaturist
 Emile Mercier (1901–1981) - editorial cartoonist for The Mirror
 Pat Oliphant (1934– ) – 1967 Pulitzer Prize winner
 Bruce Petty (1929– ) - political cartoonist and animator
 Ron Tandberg (1943–2018) - editorial cartoonist for The Age
 Monty Wedd (OA) (1921–2012) – creator of Captain Justice, Ned Kelly and Ben Hall comic strips

ACA presidents

Stanley Awards

The Stanley Awards are issued annually by the Australian Cartoonists' Association and recognise the best of Australian cartoonists and cartooning.

Gold Stanley Award
The ACA's ultimate credit to a cartoonist is the Gold Stanley Award (named after Australian cartoonist Stan Cross, who was a longtime president of the ACA).

Previous recipients of the award are:

Jim Russell Award
The Jim Russell Award, formerly the Silver Stanley Award, (named after Australian cartoonist Jim Russell), given to individuals or organisations who, in the opinion of the ACA Board, has made a significant contribution to Australian cartooning.

Previous recipients of the award are:

Footnotes

References
 A Fleet Souvenir, The Sydney Mail, (Wednesday, 29 July 1925), p3.

External links

Australian Cartoonists' Association – official website
The Stanleys
 Lindesay, Vane, Drawing from Life: A History of the Australian Black and White Artists' Club, State Library of New South Wales Press, (Sydney), 1994.

Australian cartoonists
Cartooning
Comics-related organizations
Australian artist groups and collectives
1924 establishments in Australia
Arts organizations established in 1924